Denmark has participated in the biennial classical music competition Eurovision Young Musicians six times since its debut in 1986, most recently taking part in 2002. Denmark hosted the contest in 1986.

The nations were represented individually, following the introduction of a preliminary round, at the 1986 contest in Copenhagen.

Participation overview

Hostings

See also
Denmark in the Eurovision Song Contest
Denmark in the Eurovision Dance Contest
Denmark in the Junior Eurovision Song Contest

References

External links 
 Eurovision Young Musicians

Countries in the Eurovision Young Musicians